Stephen Birchington (died 1407) was a British monk and writer in the 14th century.

Life
His name probably derives from a village in the Isle of Thanet. He became a monk of Christ Church, Canterbury in 1382, though it is said that he had a previous connection to that house. For some time he held the offices of treasurer and warden of the manors of the monastery.

He died on 21 August 1407.

Works
Birchington wrote Vitae Archiepiscoporum Cantuariensium ("Lives of the Archbishops of Canterbury"), which was later edited and published by Henry Wharton in his Anglia Sacra (1691).

Wharton hypothesised that Birchington wrote another and longer version of the Lives of the Archbishops, which was not preserved. There were three other manuscripts found in the same codex as the Vitae, which Wharton believed might have been written by Birchington: De Regibus Anglorum (a chronicle of England), De Pontificibus Romanis, and De Imperatoribus Romanis. However, the last two are now known to have been the work of the French Dominican, Bernard Gui. Nigel Ramsay has further argued that De Regibus, and another set of archiepiscopal lives held in Lambeth Palace Library, are more likely to be the work of a predecessor, working in about the 1360s, and that Birchington's original contribution, which would have continued the story into the later fourteenth century, is lost.

Notes

References

External links
 

English Christian monks
14th-century English writers
14th-century births
1407 deaths
Year of birth unknown
14th-century Latin writers